Andrés Federico Pereira Castelnoble (born 24 February 2000) is a Uruguayan professional footballer who plays as a right-back for Liverpool Montevideo.

Club career
A youth academy graduate of Liverpool Montevideo, Pereira made his professional debut on 4 May 2019 in a 4–0 league win against Boston River. He scored his first goal on 26 February 2020 in a 5–0 Copa Sudamericana win against Venezuelan club Llaneros.

International career
On 5 March 2021, Pereira was named in Uruguay senior team's 35-man preliminary squad for 2022 FIFA World Cup qualifying matches against Argentina and Bolivia. However, CONMEBOL suspended those matches next day amid concern over the COVID-19 pandemic. On 21 October 2022, he was named in Uruguay's 55-man preliminary squad for the 2022 FIFA World Cup.

Career statistics

Honours
Liverpool Montevideo
 Supercopa Uruguaya: 2020

Individual
 Uruguayan Primera División Team of the Year: 2020, 2022

References

External links
 

2000 births
Living people
Footballers from Montevideo
Association football defenders
Uruguayan footballers
Uruguayan Primera División players
Liverpool F.C. (Montevideo) players